The Tri-County Conference (TCC) is an athletic conference consisting of both public and parochial high schools located in Camden County, Cape May County, Cumberland County, Gloucester County and Salem County, New Jersey. Although it is called the Tri-County Conference, five counties are represented. The Tri-County Conference operates under the aegis of the New Jersey State Interscholastic Athletic Association.

History
The conference was first established in 1928, and has four divisions: Royal, Diamond, Classic, and Liberty. The Liberty Division was added in 2018 to close the student disparity gap in order to create better competition in each division and more competitive crossover games. The new division applies to all sports except girls cross country, winter track, swimming, and wrestling.

Timber Creek Regional High School announced in 2018 that they would leave the Olympic Conference and join the Tri-County Conference for the 2020-21 school year, which would have the benefit of having all three schools in the Black Horse Pike District competing in the same athletic conference.

Gloucester City Junior-Senior High School, one of the schools that had been part of the conference since its inception, left the Tri-County Conference for the Colonial Conference, and was replaced by Overbrook High School, which returned to the Tri-County Conference after being a member of the Colonial Conference from 2008 to 2020.

Hammonton High School had been a member of the Tri-County Conference from 2014 to 2020, before returning to the Cape-Atlantic League for the 2020-21 school year.

Washington Township High School announced in 2021 that they would leave the Olympic Conference and join the Tri-County Conference for the 2022-23 school year

Member schools
Schools in the conference are:

References

External links 
Tri County Conference
South Jersey Sports high school list

New Jersey high school athletic conferences
Camden County, New Jersey
Sports in Gloucester County, New Jersey
Salem County, New Jersey